Martin "Marty" Hornstein (September 11, 1937 – December 19, 2013) was an American production manager, producer and second unit director/assistant director. He served from 1976—1983 on the faculty at the American Film Institute. Hornstein was senior vice president of production for Kings Road Entertainment. He died in 2013, aged 76.

Filmography
He was producer for all films unless otherwise noted.

Film

Production manager

Second unit director or assistant director

As an actor

Television

Production manager

Second unit director or assistant director

References

External links
 

1937 births
2013 deaths
American film producers
Unit production managers